Bosintang (boshintang) or called gaejangguk in South Korea, or called dangogiguk in North Korea, is a Korean soup that includes dog meat as its primary ingredient. The soup has been claimed to provide increased virility.  The meat is boiled with vegetables such as green onions, perilla leaves, and dandelions, and spices such as doenjang (된장), gochujang (고추장), and perilla seed powder. It is seasoned with agastache rugosa before eating. The dish, one of the most common Korean foods made from dog meat, has a long history in Korean culture.

History 
The consumption of dog meat can be traced back to antiquity. Dog bones were excavated in a neolithic settlement in Changnyeong (창녕), South Gyeongsang Province. A wall painting in the Goguryeo tombs complex (고구려 고분군; 高句麗 古墳群) in South Hwanghae Province, a UNESCO World Heritage site which dates from 4th century AD, depicts a slaughtered dog in a storehouse (Ahn, 2000).

Approximately in 1816, Jeong Hak Yu (정학유; 丁學遊), the second son of Jeong Yak-yong (정약용; 丁若鏞), a prominent politician and scholar of Choseon dynasty at the time, wrote a poem called Nongawollyeonga (농가월령가; 農家月令歌). This poem, an important source of Korean folk history, describes what ordinary Korean farmer families did in each month of a year. In the description of August, the poem tells of a married woman visiting her birth parents with boiled dog meat, rice cake, and rice wine, thus showing the popularity of dog meat at the time (Ahn, 2000; Seo, 2002).

In Dongguk Seshigi (동국세시기; 東國歲時記), a book written by a Korean scholar Hong Suk Mo (홍석모; 洪錫謨) in 1849, contains a recipe for boshintang including boiled dog and green onion.

Boshintang has relation with Yukgaejang. One of boshintang's another name called gaejangguk and then people add beef instead of dog meat. people called new version called yukgaejang. Because 
'yuk' means beef, so yukgaejang is beef base gaejangguk.
 
A common misconception is that boshintang (and dog meat in general) is outright illegal in South Korea, which is untrue. It is not classified as a livestock (under the Livestock Sanitation Management Act - livestock covered are cattle, horse, donkey, sheep, goat, pig, chicken, duck, geese, turkey, quail, pheasant, rabbit and deer), which some have taken to indicate its illegality, but it simply means it is unregulated except by the more general Food Sanitation Law. As such, the conditions of the raising and slaughtering of the animals are not subject to inspection, unlike the above regulated livestock. Dog meat (of which boshintang is one of the most commonly served dishes) is still regularly consumed and can be found easily at many restaurants across South Korea. In 2006 it was, in fact, the 4th most commonly consumed meat in South Korea, after beef, chicken and pork (an industry value of 1.4 trillion won).

Names 
There are many different names for this dish in the Korean language.

Controversy

See also 

 Asocena
 Korean cuisine
 List of soups
 List of meat dishes
 Nureongi

Notes
Not to be confused with the homophone "게장" (gejang; marinated crabs) or "육개장" (Yukgaejang; beef soup).

References

Korean soups and stews
Meat dishes
Dog meat
North Korean cuisine